Viking FK 2, commonly known as just Viking 2, is the reserve team of Viking FK. They currently play in the Norwegian Third Division.

History
Since year 2000, Viking 2 have played in the Norwegian Second Division and the Norwegian Third Division. Their best position is a 1st place finish in the 2005 Second Division. As reserve teams are not allowed to play in the Norwegian First Division, second placed FK Haugesund were promoted instead.

Recent seasons

Source:

References

External links
 Official website

Reserves
Norwegian reserve football teams
Sport in Stavanger